The Arboretum de Charvols, of approximately hectare extent, also called the Arboretum du Plateau de La Chaise-Dieu, is an arboretum located in Malvières, Haute-Loire, Auvergne, France. It is open daily without charge.

The arboretum was established in 1993 on a former agricultural clearing in the middle of the forest of La Chaise-Dieu, at an altitude of approximately 900 meters, with a primary mission of timber trials for enrichment of the forest. It consists of almost 100 plots with collections containing 97 species (34 conifers, 38 hardwoods, 25 shrubs and fruit).

See also 
 List of botanical gardens in France

References 
 Arboretum de Charvols
 Parcs et Jardins entry (French)
 Gralon.net entry (French)
 Culture.fr entry (French)

Charvols, Arboretum de
Charvols, Arboretum de